Vanguard Presbyterian Church, formerly Vanguard Presbytery, is a Presbyterian denomination formed in 2020 by churches that separate from the Presbyterian Church in America (PCA) due to conflicts over the application of ecclesiastical discipline and the charge that the PCA has become excessively hierarchical. It identifies as a continuing church.

History 

In 2018 St. Louis Memorial Presbyterian Church, a local church federate to the Presbyterian Church in America, started the Revoice Conference, aimed at people sexually attracted to other people of the same sex. The conference argued that sex should only be practiced in marriage and that Christian marriage is only between a man and a woman. Therefore, Christians sexually attracted to other people of the same sex should be celibate.

However, it was argued that Christians sexually attracted to other people of the same sex could identify themselves as gay, lesbian or bisexual, since sexual attraction would be an essential element of the individual's identity. Such a position was the subject of controversy and decisions regarding ecclesiastical discipline were a source of conflict.

A group of disaffected churches broke away from the Presbyterian Church in America and formed the Vanguard Presbytery. The denomination's first General Assembly took place on July 30, 2020.

After the formation of the Vanguard Presbytery, the Reformed Presbyterian Church in the United States – another splinter denomination from the Presbyterian Church in America, formed in 1973 – was dissolved and its local churches joined the new denomination.

In May 2022 4 congregations, including both who had joined from the former RPCUS, withdrew from Vanguard Presbytery to form a new denomination called Christ Reformed Presbyterian Church.

Doctrine 

The Vanguard Presbytery believe in Young Earth Creationism.

References 

Presbyterian denominations in the United States
Presbyterian denominations established in the 21st century
Christian organizations established in 2020